The 2017 American Athletic Conference women's basketball tournament was a postseason tournament held from March 3–6, 2017 in the Mohegan Sun Arena in Uncasville, Connecticut. Connecticut received an automatic bid to the 2017 NCAA Division I women's basketball tournament.

Seeds
All the teams in the American Athletic Conference qualified for the tournament. Teams were seeded based on conference record, and then a tiebreaker system was used. Teams seeded 6–11 played in the opening round, and teams seeded 1–5 received a bye to the quarterfinals.

Schedule
All tournament games are nationally televised on an ESPN network:

Bracket

Note: * denotes overtime

See also

 2017 American Athletic Conference men's basketball tournament

References

American Athletic Conference women's basketball tournament
2016–17 American Athletic Conference women's basketball season
2017 in sports in Connecticut
College basketball tournaments in Connecticut
Sports competitions in Uncasville, Connecticut